Fuyu is a county of western Heilongjiang province, China, under the administration of Qiqihar City, the downtown of which is  to the southwest. Various economic crops and the milk are produced in the fertile land.

Toponymy 
Fuyu County is named after the nearby , which derives from a Jurchen word for waterlogged depression. The county's name been transcribed into Chinese in a number of different ways, such as Wuyur, Huyur, Huyur, and Wuyur.

History 
The area of present-day Fuyu County was once inhabited by the Sushen.

The area also once belonged to the kingdom of Buyeo, and later .

The area would later be inhabited by the Heishui Mohe.

Following the Jin dynasty, the area was ruled by the Yuan dynasty.

Under the Ming dynasty, which followed the Yuan, the area was administered as part of the Nurgan Regional Military Commission.

During the Qing dynasty, the area was administered as part of Qiqihar. In 1685, Qing settlers established a settlement in contemporary , known as Dalaiketun.

On October 1, 1933, the puppet state of Manchukuo established Fuyu County. Since then, the county has changed provinces numerous times, and has changed prefecture a number of times, until December 15, 1984, when it was placed under Qiqihar, which has remained since.

Administrative divisions
Fuyu County is divided into six towns, three townships, and one ethnic township.

Climate
Fuyu has a cold, monsoon-influenced, humid continental climate (Köppen Dwa), with four distinct seasons. It has long, bitterly cold, dry winters and very warm, rainy summers.

Demographics

Ethnic groups 
The county is home to 17 different ethnic groups: Han Chinese, Manchu, Daur, Kyrgyz, Mongolian, Hui, Tibetan, Miao, Yi, Zhuang, Buyi, Korean, Xibe, Yao, Ewenki, Oroqen, and Uygur. Much of the county's ethnic minorities live in villages clustered together, such as Manchus living in the village of Sanjiazi (Romanized Manchu: Ilan Boo), Kyrgyz living in Wujiazi, Daurs living in Dengke and other villages, and Mongols living in Daxiaoquanzi.

Manchu 
Fuyu County is home to approximately 7,000 Manchu people, most of whom live in the villages of Damagang, Xiaomagang, and Dagaoliang. The town of  hosts an annual Manchu sports festival, which includes horse racing, wrestling, archery, a competition in the traditional Manchu sport of pearl ball, and other events.

Daur 
Fuyu County's government estimates that there are approximately 6,000 Daur people living in the county, and that the county's Daur population migrated to the area during the 1750s.

Villages in Fuyu County with large amounts of Daur people include Dengke Dongji, Dahazhou, Liangchufang, Shiwuli, Dongtaha, Xiaogaoliang, Xitaha, Kumu, Jiqibao and Fufeng.

Mongol 
Fuyu County is home to over 2,000 Mongols, who are predominantly Oirats. The county's Mongol population is largely concentrated in the villages of Daquanzi, Xiaoquanzi, Chenjiazi, Bajiazi, and Sanjianfang.

Fuyu Kyrgyz 

The largely Kyrgyz village of Wujiazi is the largest concentration of Kyrgyz people in China, outside of Xinjiang. Of the 653 people who live in the village, 219 (33.54%) are Kyrgyz. Fuyu County as a whole has 1,400 Kyrgyz people. The Fuyu Kyrgyz are separate from the other Kyrgyz ethnic group (see the Fuyu Kyrgyz language classification), but they are usually listed as Kyrgyz by the authorities.

Languages 
Sanjiazi (Romanized Manchu: Ilan Boo) in Fuyu County is one of the few villages whose elderly inhabitants are considered to being the last native speakers of Manchu. The village's school offers courses in Manchu.

The Fuyu Kyrgyz language is spoken in Fuyu County. It is not a variety of Kyrgyz, but is closer to the Siberian modern Khakas and the ancient language of the Yenisei Kyrgyz.

See also 

 Aihui District, home to the village of Dawujia, which also boasts native Manchu speakers
 Daur people
 Kyrgyz in China
 Manchu people
Sanjiazi

External links
Official website of Fuyu County Government
51yala.com map of Fuyu County (in Chinese)
onegreen.net map of Fuyu County (in Chinese)

References

Districts of Qiqihar